Ingun Brechan (born 16 April 1954) is a Norwegian sport rower. She was born in Trondheim. She competed at the 1976 Summer Olympics in Montreal, where she placed fourth in the double sculls together with Solfrid Johansen.

References

External links 
 

1954 births
Living people
Sportspeople from Trondheim
Norwegian female rowers
Olympic rowers of Norway
Rowers at the 1976 Summer Olympics
Norwegian female speed skaters